William White was an Anglican priest in Ireland in the late 18th and early 19th centuries: a native of Dublin and educated at Trinity College there,  he was Dean of Kilfenora from 1716 until his resignation in 1724.

References

Deans of Kilfenora
17th-century Irish Anglican priests
18th-century Irish Anglican priests
Christian clergy from Dublin (city)
Alumni of Trinity College Dublin